The 1966 Northwestern Wildcats team represented Northwestern University during the 1966 Big Ten Conference football season. In their third year under head coach Alex Agase, the Wildcats compiled a 3–6–1 record (2–4–1 against Big Ten Conference opponents) and finished in a tie for seventh place in the Big Ten Conference.

The team's offensive leaders were quarterback Bill Melzer with 1,171 passing yards, Bob McKelvey with 459 rushing yards, and Roger Murphy with 777 receiving yards.

Schedule

References

Northwestern
Northwestern Wildcats football seasons
Northwestern Wildcats football